The Vaughan Foods beheading incident occurred on September 25, 2014, when a man attacked two employees at the Vaughan Foods food processing plant in Moore, Oklahoma, United States, with a knife.  Colleen Hufford was beheaded, while another employee, Traci Johnson, was stabbed and critically injured. The perpetrator, identified as Alton Nolen (a man who was fired from the plant prior to the attack), was then shot and wounded by Vaughan Foods Chief Operating Officer Mark Vaughan. Nolen was charged with first-degree murder and assault and battery with a deadly weapon, while facing possible federal charges as well. The attack came to national attention due to its gruesome nature, which followed a well-publicized recent series of beheadings carried out by the Islamic State of Iraq and Syria  (ISIS).

Nolen was convicted of murder and assault in October 2017. A jury recommended that he receive the death penalty, and, on December 15, 2017, a judge sentenced Nolen to death by lethal injection.

Attack 
On September 25, 2014, a Vaughan Foods employee identified as Alton Nolen was suspended from his job in suburban Oklahoma City  after one of the victims (Traci Johnson) initiated a complaint against him following an argument "about [Nolen] not liking white people," according to Cleveland County Prosecutor Greg Mashburn.  Immediately afterwards, he went home to retrieve a knife and placed it inside his shoe. He then drove to the plant's main distribution center, crashed into a parked car, and entered the front administrative office area. There, according to detectives, he attacked a female employee (Colleen Hufford) from behind with the knife, first slashing her throat and then beheading her. Other coworkers tried to stop him during the assault by kicking him and throwing chairs at him. He slashed the throat and face of another female employee, Traci Johnson, intending to behead her. The attack ended when he was shot and wounded by Vaughan Foods Chief Operating Officer Mark Vaughan, an Oklahoma County reserve deputy, and arrested by responding police.

Victims 
The slain victim in the attack was identified as 54-year-old Colleen Hufford (January 5, 1960 - September 25, 2014). Her cause of death was verified to be "decapitation due to multiple sharp force trauma to the neck" and classified as a homicide. 43-year-old Traci Johnson, the injured victim, was treated at the University of Oklahoma Medical Center for multiple stab wounds and survived her injuries.

Perpetrator

Alton Nolen

Alton Alexander Nolen (born August 16, 1984), at age 30, was identified as the sole perpetrator of the attack. He worked as a production line employee at Vaughan Foods before being suspended. He was charged with assault and battery on a police officer after being pulled over in 2010 for having a suspended license plate. He fled, sparking a massive manhunt that lasted for twelve hours. Nolen was sentenced to five years in prison but was released in March 2013 after serving two years and ordered to attend an anger management course. He was also convicted of cocaine possession with the intent to distribute during the following year.

Nolen had been suspended from his job before the attack due to "personnel issues," although specific details remain unclear.  Injured victim Traci Johnson later said it was from an altercation she had with him when he stated he "did not like white people".  The weapon he used in the attack was a 10-inch work knife used by employees to cut lettuce and other vegetables, allegedly acquired from his home.  County District Attorney Greg Mashburn noted that Nolen reportedly had three specific targets for the attack, including Johnson. The other two reported targets were not hurt during the incident. Nolen was shot and wounded during the attack by the company's Chief Operating Officer, a reserve deputy who happened to be armed.

Islamic connection 
The motive for the attack was initially unclear, as it was unknown if the suspect's beliefs played a role in the attack.  In their search warrant requests, police reported that witnesses had stated "Nolen had several previous disagreements and arguments with employees," while describing him as becoming increasingly violent, disrespectful, and aggressive towards his co-workers. "Witnesses also had overheard Nolen saying that he did not like and beat Caucasians."  Nolen had also "recently converted to the Islam religion and was attempting to convince other employees to convert to the religion," and that Nolen had become aggressive and belligerent to other employees while wanting others to call him 'Muhammad.'

However, prosecutors noted that Nolen had demonstrated an "infatuation" with beheadings. Because of the brutal manner of death and the fact that the attack followed a series of high-profile videotaped beheadings carried out by Islamic State (ISIS) militants in the Middle East, Moore police asked the FBI to assist in the investigation.  The FBI was also investigating the attack because Nolen "was saying Arabic terms in the attack," according to County Prosecutor Greg Mashburn.  Although Nolen attended a Baptist church as a youth, Oklahoma prison system records listed his religion as Islam.  FBI officials confirmed that their investigation included whether Nolen's recent conversion to Islam was somehow linked to the crime.  Moore Police Sgt. Jeremy Lewis confirmed his department's request for FBI help investigating Nolen's background. Oklahoma prison records also show that Nolen, who has a previous criminal record, has a tattoo reading "Assalamu Alaikum," an Arabic greeting that translates to "Peace be with you."

Using his Islamic name, "Jah'Keem Yisrael" his Facebook page featured photos of the Taliban, Osama bin Laden, as well as an image of a partially decapitated man with someone standing over him, pulling his head back to show the wound. A photo of the September 11 attacks was shown with the caption:

A Future Prophecy Revelation 18:8 She (The statue Of Liberty) is going into flames. She and anybody who's with her.

Patrick T. Dunleavy, former deputy inspector general of the New York State Police Criminal Intelligence Unit and author of The Fertile Soil of Jihad: Terrorism's Prison Connection, calls it likely that Alton's actions were the result of radicalization.

Saad Mohammed, director of information for the Islamic Society of Greater Oklahoma City, confirmed that Alton Nolen began worshipping at the Islamic Society of Greater Oklahoma City (ISGOC) mosque in May and that he had seen him there several times since. A picture on Nolan's Facebook page shows him attending the mosque on September 5, 2014, nineteen days before the attack. Those who attended the same mosque as Nolen described his behavior as "a little odd" and "weird"; nonetheless, his prior behavior did not raise any red flags. Mohammed stated after the attack that Nolen's actions did not reflect the beliefs of Islam.

Legal proceedings 
On September 30, Nolen was charged with first-degree murder and assault and battery with a deadly weapon.  According to police, he "openly admitted" to killing Hufford and injuring Johnson during the attack. Prosecutors are expected to pursue the death penalty in the case. A preliminary hearing was scheduled for October 14, but it was later rescheduled to December 2 due to a scheduling conflict with Nolen's lawyers. It was rescheduled again to April 2015. The preliminary hearing was delayed again until June 10, but it was postponed again until July 30. On September 15, 2015, a competency trial for Nolen was set for October 26.

On October 28, 2015, District Judge Lori Walkley ruled that Alton Nolen was competent to stand trial. He was formally accused of beheading co-worker Colleen Hufford and nearly beheading Traci Johnson, a second co-worker, who survived her injuries. He also faced four assault and battery charges for threatening or assaulting co-workers with a knife. Prosecutors sought the death penalty.

On August 17, 2016, an Oklahoma judge ruled that Nolen was not competent to enter a guilty plea in his murder case. The state mental hospital in Vinita handled Nolen's treatment and evaluation. The case was temporarily put on hold until Nolen returned from Vinita for a post-evaluation hearing. Nolen's trial officially began on September 11, 2017. On September 30, 2017, after two hours of deliberation, the jury convicted Nolen of one count of first-degree murder and five counts of assault. On October 2, 2017, the jury sentenced him to life in prison for the assaults. The jury also recommended on October 12, 2017, that Nolen be sentenced to death for murder.

On December 15, 2017, Cleveland County District Judge Lori Walkley followed the jury's recommendation, and sentenced Nolen to death by lethal injection.

On March 18, 2021, the Oklahoma Court of Criminal Appeals affirmed the ruling.

See also 
 2014 ISIL beheading incidents

References 

Attacks in the United States in 2014
Deaths by decapitation
2014 in Oklahoma
Crimes in Oklahoma
Workplace violence in the United States
Islamic terrorism in the United States
Murder in Oklahoma
2014 murders in the United States
September 2014 crimes in the United States